Garbania may refer to:

 Garbarnia Kraków – Polish football club
 Garbarnia Kurów – Polish football club